The 1987 Australian Formula 2 Championship was a CAMS sanctioned motor racing title for drivers of Australian Formula 2 racing cars. It was the 20th Australian Formula 2 Championship.

The championship was won by Arthur Abrahams driving a modified version of a Cheetah Mk.8 after championship leader Mark McLaughlin (Elfin 852) collided with third placed driver Graeme Smith (Cheetah Mk.7) in the warm-up of the final race of the season. Abrahams only win was at the final race compared to McLaughlin's three. The other race wins were taken by Cheetah driver Derek Pingel and Ralt RT30 driver David Brabham. Abrahams won the championship by 20 points. Smith stayed third, 41 points behind McLaughlin and just four points ahead of Pingel. Magnum driver Neil Israel was a further three points behind.

Calendar
The championship was contested over a six-round series with one race per round.
 Round 1, Symmons Plains, Tasmania, 8 March
 Round 2, Lakeside, Queensland, 5 April
 Round 3, Adelaide International Raceway, South Australia, 3 May
 Round 4, Amaroo Park, New South Wales, 21 June
 Round 5, Mallala Motor Sport Park, South Australia, 9 August
 Round 6, Sandown Park, Victoria, 13 September .

Points system
Championship points were awarded on a 30–27–24–21–19–17–15–14–13–12–11–10–9–8–7–6–5–4–3–2 basis to the first 20 finishers in each round.

Results

Notes and references

Further reading
 Barry Catford, Australian Formula 2 Championship, Australian Motor Racing Year 1987/88, pages 225–239

External links
 Images of Australian Open Wheelers – 1987, including two from the Amaroo Park round of the AF2C

Australian Formula 2 Championship
Formula 2 Championship